Death Is Here 3 (Chinese: 笔仙惊魂3) is a 2014 Chinese horror film directed by David Kuan.

Reception
The film has grossed ¥35.2 million in China.

See also
BiXian Panic

References

2014 films
2014 horror films
2010s supernatural horror films
Chinese supernatural horror films
2010s Mandarin-language films
Films directed by Guan Er